Trinervitermes rubidus, is a species of mound building termite of the genus Trinervitermes. It is native to Sri Lanka.

References

External links
A Preliminary Inventory of Subterranean Termites in the Premises of Faculty of Science, University of Kelaniya and the Potential of a Ponerine Ant Species, Neemazal-F and Citronella Oil in the Control of Two Termite Species

Termites
Insects described in 1859